Ville Jaakko Mäntymaa (born 8 March 1985) is a Finnish former professional ice hockey defenceman.

Mäntymaa played in the SM-liiga for Tappara, Lahti Pelicans, JYP Jyväskylä and Kärpät as well as in Elitserien for Frölunda HC. He was drafted 280th overall by the Mighty Ducks of Anaheim in the 2003 NHL Entry Draft.

Career statistics

Regular season and playoffs

International

External links

1985 births
Living people
Finnish ice hockey defencemen
Frölunda HC players
JYP Jyväskylä players
Oulun Kärpät players
Kiekko-Vantaa players
Lahti Pelicans players
Anaheim Ducks draft picks
Tappara players
People from Seinäjoki
Sportspeople from South Ostrobothnia